Alexander Isaac Beresford (born 17 October 1980) is an English weather presenter employed by ITV.

Early life
Beresford was born in Bristol, England. His mother is English and his father is Guyanese. He grew up in the Eastville area of Bristol and went to the St Thomas More RC School (now Fairfield High School) in Eastville.

Career
Beresford primarily worked for The West Tonight on ITV West based in Bristol, originally as a teleprompter operator in August 2004, but later retrained as a weather presenter in 2005.

He has also presented the national ITV Weather since 26 November 2007.

In February 2009 he transferred to The West Country Tonight on ITV West Country following the demise of ITV West.

He was set to join the ITV Breakfast programme Daybreak  as its weather presenter on a permanent basis, this after he made a guest appearance, presenting on 16 March 2012.  However, he quit for personal reasons, but still continued to present on a stand-in basis for Laura Tobin. Daybreak was axed on 25 April 2014; it was replaced by a new show, Good Morning Britain where Beresford has continued to provide cover for Tobin. He appears both in the studio and on location at events elsewhere.

Beginning on 30 April 2013, Beresford presented a three-part series for Channel 4 called The World's Weirdest Weather. The following year, he hosted four-part Channel 4 series Britain's Most Extreme Weather which began airing on 28 April 2014.

In June 2015, January 2016, April 2019, June 2020 and October 2020 Beresford presented five episodes of ITV's Tonight programme.

On 20 August 2020, Beresford made his debut as a guest presenter of ITV's Good Morning Britain.

On 9 March 2021, the morning after the UK airing of the Oprah with Meghan and Harry interview, Piers Morgan walked off the Good Morning Britain show, following weather presenter Beresford's alternative narrative for Morgan's behaviour.

"Piers Morgan's comments about the Duchess of Sussex on Good Morning Britain have attracted a record number of complaints to TV regulator Ofcom."

From 6 September 2020, Beresford co-presents ITV's All Around Britain, a new weekly topical magazine series.

In March 2022, Alex left his position at ITV West Country to take up the newly-created role of live weather presenter on the extended ITV Evening News. Alex presents from the main studios in London, as well as occasionally reporting on the weather from other locations across the UK.

Dancing on Ice

Beresford took part in the tenth series of Dancing on Ice in 2018, partnered with Brianne Delcourt. He was the eighth celebrity to be eliminated from the show following a skate off with Kem Cetinay and his partner Alex Murphy

Other projects
Beresford runs a Diversity School Tour Project where he visits inner-city schools to talk about media careers. He was also chosen for the national role model programme for young black men by Hazel Blears.

Personal life
Beresford resides in Bristol and London.

He separated from his ex partner Natalia in 2019; together they have a son, Cruz. They were never married despite online reports.

Filmography

References

External links

Alex Beresford on LinkedIn

1980 births
British television presenters
English people of Guyanese descent
ITV Breakfast presenters and reporters
ITV Weather
Living people
People from Bristol
Television personalities from Bristol